Precious Hearts Romances Presents: Los Bastardos is a 2018 Philippine drama television series under Precious Hearts Romances loosely based on the Filipino pocket book novel Cardinal Bastards by Vanessa, starring Ronaldo Valdez, Jake Cuenca, Diego Loyzaga, Marco Gumabao, Albie Casiño, Joshua Colet, Joseph Marco, and Gloria Diaz. The series premiered on ABS-CBN's Kapamilya Gold afternoon block and worldwide via The Filipino Channel from October 15, 2018, to September 27, 2019, replacing Araw Gabi.

Series overview

Episodes

Season 1 (2018–19)
<onlyinclude>

Season 2 (2019)
<onlyinclude>

Season 3 (2019)

Episodes notes

References

Lists of Philippine drama television series episodes